Grubinger is a surname. Notable people with the surname include:

Eva Grubinger (born 1970), Austrian artist
Martin Grubinger (born 1983), Austrian drummer